Percy E. Downe (born July 8, 1954) is a Canadian Senator and former political aide.

Since graduating from the University of Prince Edward Island in 1977, Downe has had the opportunity to serve at the provincial and federal levels of Canadian Government. From 1986 to 1993, Downe was executive assistant to the Premier of Prince Edward Island, Joe Ghiz. Downe moved to Ottawa following the Liberal victory in the 1993 federal election, and served as executive assistant to the Secretary of State for Veterans Affairs. He subsequently served as executive assistant to the Minister of Fisheries and Oceans, and then the Minister of Labour.

He joined the Prime Minister's Office as director of appointments in 1998. He became Prime Minister Jean Chrétien's chief of staff in 2001. He was appointed to the Senate of Canada on June 26, 2003.

Downe is currently Vice-Chair of the Senate Standing Committee on Foreign Affairs and International Trade, Joint-Chair of the Standing Joint Committee on the Library of Parliament, a member of the Senate Standing Committee on Internal Economy, Budgets and Administration, and is also on the Executive Committee of the Canada-Europe Parliamentary Association.

He was also formerly a member of the Senate Standing Committee on National Finance, the Senate Standing Committee on Legal and Constitutional Affairs and the Senate Standing Committee on Rules, Rights and Procedures of Parliament.

Downe is also currently Vice-Chair of The Parliamentary Network on the World Bank & International Monetary Fund.

On January 29, 2014, Liberal Party leader Justin Trudeau announced all Liberal Senators, including Downe, were removed from the Liberal caucus, and would continue sitting as Independents. The Senators referred to themselves as the Senate Liberal Caucus even though they were no longer members of the parliamentary Liberal caucus.

With the Senate Liberal Caucus facing losing official parliamentary caucus status in 2020 with a third of its caucus facing mandatory retirements on their turning age 75, Senator Joseph Day announced that the Senate Liberal Caucus had been dissolved and a new Progressive Senate Group formed in its wake, with the entire membership joining the new group, including this senator. However, on November 18, 2019, Downe announced he was joining the Canadian Senators Group.

He resides in Charlottetown with his wife and two daughters.

References

External links 
 
 Liberal Senate Forum
 Senator Percy Downe's Website: http://www.sen/pdowne/main.htm 

1954 births
Canadian senators from Prince Edward Island
Chiefs of staff of the Canadian Prime Minister's Office
Liberal Party of Canada senators
Senate Liberal Caucus
Progressive Senate Group
Living people
People from Charlottetown
21st-century Canadian politicians
Canadian Senators Group